The 1930–31 New York Americans season was the sixth season of play. The Americans improved their record to escape last-place in the Canadian Division, but did not qualify for the playoffs.

Offseason
Eddie Gerard was hired to coach the team. Four players were picked up for cash from the Montreal Maroons: Frank Carson, Mike Neville, Hap Emms and Red Dutton. Dutton would be with the club until its demise in 1942, becoming the team manager after the NHL took over. Just before the start of the season, the Americans traded Lionel Conacher to the Maroons for cash. The Americans signed three new players: John Keating, Vernon Ayres and Gord Kuhn.

Regular season

Final standings

Record vs. opponents

Game log

Playoffs
The Americans did not qualify.

Player stats

Regular season
Scoring

Goaltending

Playoffs
The Americans did not qualify.

Awards and records

Transactions

See also
1930–31 NHL season

References

New York Americans seasons
New York Americans
New York Americans
New York Amer
New York Amer
1930s in Manhattan
Madison Square Garden